Ilmenau is a Samtgemeinde ("collective municipality") in the district of Lüneburg, in Lower Saxony, Germany. It is situated along the river Ilmenau (hence the name), approx. 8 km south of Lüneburg. Its seat is in the village Melbeck.

Division of the municipality
The Samtgemeinde Ilmenau consists of the following municipalities:
 Barnstedt
 Deutsch Evern
 Embsen
 Melbeck

References